Battambang (Vealbekchan) Airport  is an airport serving Battambang, a city in Battambang Province, Cambodia. The airport is 3 kilometers from the city center in Battambang. It has a total land area of 128.68 hectares.

History
The airport commenced operations in 1968.
It ended all flights in 1987.
It is now a military airbase.
In 2018 it reopened for small, private aircraft. In early 2020 the airport was planned to reopen for domestic-commercial flights. In December 2020, it is announced that the reopening plan is under studies and conducting. But now it looks like the plan is canceled.

Facilities

References

External links

 

Airports in Cambodia
Buildings and structures in Battambang province